Jelle Donders (born 18 June 1993) is a Belgian cyclist, who last rode for UCI Continental team .

Major results
2014
 3rd Road race, National Under-23 Road Championships
2016
 3rd De Kustpijl
2017
 3rd Grand Prix Criquielion
 8th Grand Prix de la Somme
2018
 4th Ronde van Limburg

References

External links

1993 births
Living people
Belgian male cyclists
People from Bornem
Cyclists from Antwerp Province
21st-century Belgian people